The Church of the Resurrection (known colloquially as "Rez") is an Anglican parish in the Capitol Hill area of Washington, D.C. Planted in 2002, it owns and occupies a historic church building facing Marion Park. It is one of three surviving churches—alongside St. Luke's Episcopal Church and the Third Baptist Church—that were designed by Calvin T. S. Brent, generally considered to be Washington's first black architect.

History of the building

The church building, located at 501 E Street S.E., was designed by Calvin Brent for the Mount Jezreel Baptist Church, which was pastored by Temple Robinson and composed of freed slaves. The church bought the plot of land for $900 in 1882. After the building was completed in brick in a Gothic Revival style, it was valued at $20,000. The church was renovated in the 1920s and an education annex was completed in the 1960s.

However, by the 1980s, the growing congregation had insufficient room to expand. In 1982, Mount Jezreel Baptist relocated, first to Riggs Park and then to Silver Spring, Maryland. In 1984, Pleasant Lane Baptist Church (renamed after 2010 to Progress for Christ Baptist Church) occupied the building.

Acquisition by Rez

Church of the Resurrection was planted as a house church in 2002 by the Rev. Dan Claire and began meeting in rented Capitol Hill space starting in 2004. Sunday evening services were held at Christ Our Shepherd Church and eventually a morning service was added at Capitol Hill Seventh-Day Adventist Church. Part of the Anglican Mission in America and the Anglican Church of Rwanda prior to the founding of the ACNA, when it joined the network that would eventually become the Diocese of Christ Our Hope, Rez planted the Church of the Advent in Columbia Heights (2008) and the Church of the Ascension in Arlington, Virginia (2009, now defunct). It also supported church plants in Harrisonburg, Virginia; Boston; Chicago; Buffalo, New York; and Salisbury, England.

In 2021, after raising $1.83 million toward the purchase, Rez bought the church at 501 E Street S.E. from Progress for Christ Baptist Church. Rez is making renovations to the space while occupying it. Today the church is a contributing property to the Capitol Hill Historic District.

Controversies 
On April 5, 2022, a group of survivors from the Anglican Diocese of Christ Our Hope came forward and claimed that diocesan leaders, including Bishop Steve Breedlove, failed to adequately hold Reverend Dan Claire at Church of the Resurrection accountable for his abusive actions and did not center the needs of survivors. The survivor complaints resulted in an investigation into Breedlove's handing of the abuse allegations, conducted by Grand River Solutions.

References

External links
 Church of the Resurrection website

Anglican Church in North America church buildings in the United States
Religious organizations established in 2002
African-American history of Washington, D.C.
Churches completed in 1887
Churches completed in 1894
Historic district contributing properties in Washington, D.C.
Capitol Hill
Churches in Washington, D.C.